Jaudon is a surname. Notable people with the surname include:

Samuel Jaudon (1796–1874), American banker and businessman
Valerie Jaudon (born 1945), American painter

Surnames of French origin